Wayne Odesnik won the singles competition in January 2009 and he was the defending champion, but did not take part in these championships this time.
Michael Russell won in the final 6–1, 6–1, against Michael Yani.

Seeds

Draw

Final four

Top half

Bottom half

External links
 Main Draw
 Qualifying Draw

USTA LA Tennis Open - Singles
USTA LA Tennis Open